The 1948–49 BAA season was the Royals' first season in the BAA (later known as the NBA).

Draft

Roster

Regular season

Season standings

Record vs. opponents

Game log

Playoffs

|- align="center" bgcolor="#ccffcc"
| 1
| March 22
| St. Louis
| W 93–64
| Bob Davies (23)
| Edgerton Park Arena
| 1–0
|- align="center" bgcolor="#ccffcc"
| 2
| March 23
| @ St. Louis
| W 66–64
| Bobby Wanzer (17)
| St. Louis Arena
| 2–0
|-

|- align="center" bgcolor="#ffcccc"
| 1
| March 27
| Minneapolis
| L 79–80
| Arnie Risen (17)
| Edgerton Park Arena
| 0–1
|- align="center" bgcolor="#ffcccc"
| 2
| March 29
| @ Minneapolis
| L 55–67
| Arnie Risen (21)
| St. Paul Auditorium
| 0–2
|-

Awards and records
Bob Davies, All-NBA First Team

References

Sacramento Kings seasons
Rochester
Rochester Royals
Rochester Royals